The Phytoseiinae are a subfamily of mites in the Phytoseiidae family.

Genera
The subfamily Phytoseiinae contains these genera:
 Chantia Pritchard & Baker, 1962
 Phytoseius Ribaga, 1904
 Platyseiella Muma, 1961

References

Phytoseiidae
Arthropod subfamilies